Phoenix Rising Soccer Stadium  is a soccer-specific stadium in Phoenix, Arizona. It is the home of Phoenix Rising FC of the USL Championship. The stadium is scheduled to be completed before the start of the 2023 USL Championship season. The stadium replaces Phoenix Rising's previous home, built on land in the Gila River Indian Community near I-10 and Loop 202.

History
After the 2022 season, Rising FC signed a lease agreement with the City of Phoenix to build the stadium (which is modular in design) to an area north of Phoenix Sky Harbor International Airport. The club's previous home, Phoenix Rising Soccer Complex at Wild Horse Pass, is located inside the Gila River Indian Community near Chandler, and the tribal government at the time did not allow fans to place wagers on site, not even on mobile apps, due to sports-betting restrictions on its land.

The first game at the new stadium is scheduled for April 1, 2023, with Rising playing San Diego Loyal SC.

References 

Sports venues completed in 2021
Soccer venues in Arizona
Sports venues in Phoenix, Arizona
Phoenix Rising FC
USL Championship stadiums
Buildings and structures in Phoenix, Arizona
2021 establishments in Arizona